Khanun may refer to three tropical cyclones in the Pacific Ocean. The name was contributed by Thailand and is the name of a Thai fruit (jackfruit).

 Typhoon Khanun (2005) (T0515, 15W, Kiko), in the 2005 season struck China
 Severe Tropical Storm Khanun (2012) (T1207, 08W, Enteng)
 Typhoon Khanun (2017) (T1720, 24W, Odette), a mid-range Category 2 typhoon that affected Hainan island as a weak tropical storm.

Pacific typhoon set index articles